O'Neill Butte is a -elevation summit located in the Grand Canyon, in Coconino County of northern Arizona, United States. Cedar Ridge connects O'Neill Butte with Yaki Point on the South Rim. Access to this prominence is via the South Kaibab Trail which traverses the east slope of the peak. According to the Köppen climate classification system, O'Neill Butte is located in a cold semi-arid climate zone.

Geology
The summit block of O'Neill Butte is composed of Permian Esplanade Sandstone, which is the uppermost member of the Pennsylvanian-Permian Supai Group. The rest of the Supai Group overlays Mississippian Redwall Limestone. The cliff-forming Redwall overlays the Cambrian Tonto Group, and below that Paleoproterozoic Vishnu Basement Rocks at river level in Granite Gorge. Precipitation runoff from O'Neill Butte drains north to the Colorado River via Pipe Creek (west aspect) and Cremation Creek (east).

History

This feature is named for William Owen "Buckey" O'Neill (1860–1898), an Arizona Territory politician, who died as a captain of Theodore Roosevelt's Rough Riders at the Battle of San Juan Hill. O'Neill did some prospecting in the Grand Canyon in 1890, and also figured prominently in bringing the railroad to the canyon's South Rim. This landform's toponym was officially adopted in 1906 by the U.S. Board on Geographic Names.

Gallery

See also
 Geology of the Grand Canyon area

References

External links

 Weather forecast: National Weather Service
 O'Neill Butte rock climbing: Mountainproject.com
 Climbing photos: Themtsarecalling.com

Grand Canyon
Grand Canyon, South Rim
Landforms of Coconino County, Arizona
Colorado Plateau
Grand Canyon National Park
North American 1000 m summits
Buttes of Arizona
Sandstone formations of the United States